Fausto Radici (24 September 1953 – 14 April 2002) was an Italian former alpine skier who competed in the 1976 Winter Olympics.

Biography
He finished 7th in the slalom race at the 1976 Winter Olympics. He was an Italian Champion in slalom in 1974. In the World Cup he won two slalom races: 5 January 1976 at Garmisch-Partenkirchen, and 19 December 1976, at Madonna di Campiglio. He was married to alpine ski racer Elena Matous. On 14 April 2002, he committed suicide by shooting himself in a woodshed in Peia.

References

External links
 

1953 births
2002 suicides
Italian male alpine skiers
Olympic alpine skiers of Italy
Alpine skiers at the 1976 Winter Olympics
Universiade medalists in alpine skiing
Universiade gold medalists for Italy
Competitors at the 1975 Winter Universiade
Suicides by firearm in Italy
Sportspeople from Bergamo